Don State Public Library is the main public library of Rostov Oblast, and is situated in the city of Rostov-on-Don. It was established in 1886 and is the oldest library in Southern Russia. In the Soviet period it was known as the Karl Marx Rostov-on-Don State Scientific Library. It is an important cultural center of the city, hosting numerous art festivals and exhibitions.

History 
Rostov-on-Don Public Library, the first major library in the city, was opened on 7 January 1886. The new library consisted of 3,000 books, purchased by the city administration from a private library for the sum of 5,000 rubles. Until 1894, the library was housed in various private houses on Bolshaya Sadovaya Street.

In 1974, the construction of a new library building on Pushkinskaya Street began. It was designed by architect  and engineer Boris Sidelkovsky. The construction was severely delayed over the next 20 years and was finished only in 1994. On 25 May 1994 the library moved into its new premises. Three months later, in September, the library invited Russian writer Alexander Solzhenitsyn to visit and meet readers.

In May 2010, Don State Public Library hosted a conference of Russian Wikipedians.

References

1886 establishments in the Russian Empire
Buildings and structures in Rostov-on-Don
Libraries in Russia
Education in Rostov-on-Don